Khnum or also romanised Khnemu was one of the earliest-known Egyptian deities, originally the god of the source of the Nile. Since the annual flooding of the Nile brought with it silt and clay, and its water brought life to its surroundings, he was thought to be the creator of the bodies of human children, which he made at a potter's wheel, from clay, and placed in their mothers' wombs. He was later described as having moulded the other deities, and he had the titles "Divine Potter" and "Lord of created things from himself".

General information
The worship of Khnum centered on two principal riverside sites, Elephantine and Esna, which were regarded as sacred sites. At Elephantine, he was worshipped alongside Satis and Anuket. At Esna, he was worshipped alongside Menhit, Nebtu, Neith and Heka. Khnum was regarded as the guardian of the source of the Nile River. His significance led to early theophoric names of him, for children, such as Khnum-Khufwy "Khnum is my Protector", the full name of Khufu, builder of the Great Pyramid of Giza.

Khnum has also been related to the deity Min.

Temple at Elephantine
The temple at Elephantine was dedicated to Khnum, his consort Satis, and their daughter, Anuket. The temple dates back to at least the Middle Kingdom. By the Eleventh Dynasty, Khnum, Satis and Anuket are all attested at Elephantine.

During the New Kingdom, finds from the time of Ramesses II show Khnum was still worshipped there.

Opposite Elephantine, on the east bank at Aswan, Khnum, Satis and Anuket are shown on a chapel wall dating to the Ptolemaic Kingdom.

Temple at Esna

In Esna, a temple was dedicated to Khnum, Neith and Heka, among other deities. This temple began construction in Ptolemaic times, but most of the surviving parts of the temple were built in Roman times.

Khnum is sometimes depicted as a crocodile-headed god. Nebt-uu and Menhit are Khnum's principal consorts and Heka is his eldest son and successor. Both Khnum and Neith are referred to as creator deities in the texts at Esna. Khnum is sometimes referred to as the "father of the fathers" and Neith as the "mother of the mothers". They later become the parents of Ra, who is also referred to as Khnum-Re.

Other

The Temple of Beit el-Wali of Ramesses II contained statues of Khnum, Satis and Anuket, along with statues of Isis and Horus.

In other locations, such as Herwer (Tuna el-Gebel perhaps), as the moulder and creator of the human body, he was sometimes regarded as the consort of Heket, or of Meskhenet, whose responsibility was breathing life into children at the moment of birth, as the kꜣ ("ka").

Artistic conventions
In art, Khnum was usually depicted as a ram-headed man at a potter's wheel, with recently created children's bodies standing on the wheel. He was also shown holding a jar from which flowed a stream of water.

References

External links
 

 
Creator gods
Sea and river gods
Mythological caprids
Horned gods
Personifications of rivers
Nile
Personifications